Long Creek Falls may refer to:

 Long Creek Falls (Georgia)
 Long Creek Falls (South Carolina)